The Japanese occupation of New Guinea was the military occupation of the island of New Guinea by the Empire of Japan from 1941 to 1945 during World War II when Japanese forces captured the city of Rabaul.

Background 
The island of New Guinea was divided by two countries, the Netherlands (Dutch East Indies) and Australia (Territory of Papua).  The island was brought into control by the Japanese during the New Guinea campaign of World War II when Japanese forces started an invasion of New Guinea, primarily the northern part of the island, and took over the city of Rabaul.  Japanese forces also subsequently occupied Hollandia (today known as Jayapura) and established it as their capital during their occupation in New Guinea.  Japanese forces only occupied the northern region of present-day Papua New Guinea, but captured most of present-day Western Papua

Administration

Hollandia 
Japanese forces captured and occupied Hollandia in April 1942 and it was established as the capital of the administration. The Imperial Japanese Navy established a base in Jayapura port in 1942.  The Navy also anchored their ships in Humboldt Bay and later added infantry troops to strengthen their marines.  According to the Allies, there were two infantry regiments in Papua and one marine regiment.

The Dutch had tried to increase trade from Papua, but the Japanese increased it even more.  The Japanese later established Cenderawasih University in 1943.  In Hollandia, the Japanese forced the native Papuans to create roads and at Lake Sentani there were three airfields created by manual labour.  The occupation of Jayapura was described as the worst in all of the Dutch East Indies

In April 1944, US troop entered in Hollandia and fought with Japanese forces which later ended in a victory for the allies with US troops occupying the city.

Sentani 
The town of Sentani was occupied by Japanese forces on 1943 which later ended on 1944, when Allied troops rounded up 800 Japanese soldiers and killed them all.

Kavieng 
The town of Kavieng of New Ireland was occupied by Japanese forces in January 1941 and there was a military base established there by the Japanese, smaller than the one at Rabaul.  The town was frequently bombed by allied forces throughout 1943-1944 until it was liberated by Australian and American troops in 1945.  There are many sunken ships of the Japanese on the coastline of Kavieng, which is now a popular tourist destination.  Nearly the whole town was destroyed after allied troops took it back due to bombings in the area.

Rabaul 
On 23 January 1942, 5,000 Japanese forces captured Rabaul.  There were around 100 ships docked at Simpson Harbour, and many Koreans, British, and Indians were forced into labour on Rabaul.  Throughout the war, Australian submarines destroyed Japanese ships, which are now famous in Rabaul.  On 13 September 1945, Australian troops captured the city, ending the occupation.

Demographics 
Most people were native Papuans, but there were many Japanese who were primarily soldiers.  There were a huge amount of Chinese who were deported from other occupied region of New Guinea and sent to Rabaul.  There were small amounts of British, Indian, Korean, and Taiwanese from other parts of the empire who were deported to New Guinea.

War Crimes 
The Japanese were not hesitant to shoot anybody according to Allied forces and they often treated New Guineans with extreme brutality.  Many were killed on the spot if they did not listen to what the Japanese troops said.

References 

1941 establishments
1945 disestablishments
1940s in the Territory of New Guinea
1940s in the Territory of Papua
Military history of Papua New Guinea
History of Western New Guinea
Japanese occupation of the Dutch East Indies
Papua New Guinea in World War II